Personal Best may refer to:

 personal best (also called personal record), an athlete's best performance in his or her life
 Monty Python's Personal Best, a 2006 miniseries
 Personal Best, a 1982 film
 Personal Best, a 1995 album by Team Dresch
 Personal Best, a 1990 album by Selena
 Personal Best, an English band on the Specialist Subject Records label